Paranoia is a 2013 American thriller film directed by Robert Luketic. Barry L. Levy and Jason Hall wrote the screenplay, loosely based on the 2004 novel of the same name by Joseph Finder. It stars Liam Hemsworth, Gary Oldman, Amber Heard, and Harrison Ford. The film was released on August 16, 2013 and bombed at the box office, grossing $17 million against a budget of $35 million. It was described as "clichéd and unoriginal" by review aggregator Rotten Tomatoes, where it has a 7% approval rating.

Plot
Adam Cassidy is a low-level inventor who works for a corporation run by Nicholas Wyatt. After being fired for insubordination, Adam uses the company's credit card to pay for bottle service for his friends at a club. Wyatt and his enforcer, Miles Meechum, blackmail Adam into becoming a corporate spy for Wyatt by threatening to have him arrested for fraud.

Adam is trained by Judith Bolton and infiltrates a company run by Wyatt's former mentor, Jock Goddard. He provides Goddard, who stole several of Wyatt's ideas, with an advanced software able to hack into cellphones, with potential military applications. FBI Agent Gamble interrogates Adam, revealing that three other employees of Wyatt who transferred to Goddard's company were found dead, but Adam ignores him.

Adam finds out Emma Jennings, a woman he met during the party, is the Director of Marketing of Goddard's company. He initiates a relationship with Emma in order to steal files about Goddard's upcoming projects. Wyatt threatens to kill Adam's father, Frank Cassidy, if Adam doesn't steal a revolutionary prototype cellphone, called Occura developed by Goddard. Adam later finds out Meechum and Bolton are monitoring him, so he destroys the cameras in his apartment. In retaliation, Meechum runs over Adam's friend, Kevin, with a car, almost killing him. Adam is given 48 hours to steal the prototype.

Adam uses Emma's thumbprint lifted from a spoon to gain security access to the company's vault. He is confronted there by Goddard, who intends to take over Wyatt's company with evidence that Adam was acting as Wyatt's spy. Emma finds out Adam used her. Adam recruits Kevin to help him. A meeting is set with Wyatt and Goddard, where it is revealed that Bolton has spied against Wyatt on Goddard's behalf. Both men speak of the crimes they have committed to sabotage each other's companies.

Adam has secretly used software to transmit their conversation to Kevin, whose computer recordings are turned over to the FBI. Goddard, Wyatt, Bolton and Meechum are arrested by Gamble, while Adam is released for contributing to the FBI's investigation.  He opens a small startup company in Brooklyn with Kevin and their friends, and reconciles with Emma, thanking her with a passionate kiss.

Cast 
 Liam Hemsworth as Adam Cassidy
 Gary Oldman as Nicholas Wyatt
 Amber Heard as Emma Jennings 
 Harrison Ford as Augustine "Jock" Goddard
 Lucas Till as Kevin
 Embeth Davidtz as Dr. Judith Bolton
 Julian McMahon as Miles Meechum
 Josh Holloway as FBI Agent Gamble
 Richard Dreyfuss as Frank Cassidy
 Angela Sarafyan as Allison
 Nickson Ruto as Fala
 William Peltz as Morgan
 Kevin Kilner as Tom Lundgren
 Christine Marzano as Nora Sommers
 Charlie Hofheimer as Richard McAllister

Production 
Principal photography commenced on location in Philadelphia in July 2012, and returned for further filming at the end of November 2012. The first trailer was released on June 6, 2013.

Release 
Relativity Media released Paranoia on August 16, 2013, and it was a box office bomb. The film debuted at #13 in the United States, generating only $3.5 million in its first weekend and going on to gross a total of $7.4 million in the US. It made $9.7 million in other countries for a worldwide total of $17.1 million. Variety magazine listed Paranoia as one of "Hollywood's biggest box office bombs of 2013".

Reception 
Rotten Tomatoes, a review aggregator, reports that 7% of 108 critics have given Paranoia a positive review; the average rating is 3.9/10. Their consensus is: "Clichéd and unoriginal, Paranoia is a middling techno-thriller with indifferent performances and a shortage of thrills." On Metacritic, the film has a rating of 32 out of 100 based on 30 critics, indicating "generally unfavorable reviews". Audiences polled by CinemaScore gave the film an average grade of "C+" on an A+ to F scale.

Stephen Holden of The New York Times wrote, "Not since Taylor Lautner has Hollywood ogled a pretty boy this vacant and poorly prepared." Andrew Barker of Variety wrote, "No one seems paranoid enough in this indifferently made, nearly tension-free thriller." Stephen Farber of The Hollywood Reporter called it "slick but muddled".

See also 
 List of films featuring surveillance

References

External links 
 
 

2013 thriller films
2010s English-language films
2010s spy thriller films
American spy thriller films
Entertainment One films
Films about fear
Films about the Federal Bureau of Investigation
Films about security and surveillance
Films based on American thriller novels
Films directed by Robert Luketic
Films scored by Junkie XL
Films set in New York City
Films shot in New York City
Films shot in Philadelphia
Gaumont Film Company films
IM Global films
Relativity Media films
Techno-thriller films
2010s American films